Ditt Apotek is a chain of 80 pharmacies owned and run by independent pharmacists on franchise from Norsk Medisinaldepot, a subsidiary of McKesson Europe. The chain is the fourth largest, and thus smallest, in Norway. The chain was established in 2001 after the deregulation of the pharmacy market in Norway. The sister company Vitusapotek operates 133 pharmacies owned by the mother company.

Among the members are the four state owned pharmaceutical trusts that operate the pharmacies at the hospitals: Southern and Eastern Norway Pharmaceutical Trust, Western Norway Pharmaceutical Trust, Central Norway Pharmaceutical Trust, and Northern Norway Pharmaceutical Trust.

Norwegian pharmacy brands
Retail companies of Norway
Retail companies established in 2001
2001 establishments in Norway